Wulpen, Belgium, a village in Belgium, part of the municipality of Koksijde 
 Wulpen (island), a former island in the Netherlands